In the fall of 1874, a group of civic boosters in St. Louis raised $20,000 to organize the creation of the cities first professional ball club. The St. Louis Brown Stockings joined the National Association of Professional Base Ball Players for the 1875 season and finished the season in fourth place. They subsequently joined the new National League for the 1876 season. The Brown Stockings joined the National League as a founding team and thus inspired what is now a rich baseball history in the city of St. Louis.

Preseason acquisitions 
C. Orrick Bishop, a local St. Louis lawyer, was named as the Brown Stockings Vice President and given the task of going east to recruit top talent. In Brooklyn, Bishop picked up Dickey Pearce, Jack Chapman, Herman Dehlman, and Lip Pike. In and around Philadelphia, Bishop added Ned Cuthbert, Reddy Miller, George Bradley, Bill Hague, and Joe Battin.

Management 
Dickey Pearce having been signed from the 1874 Brooklyn Atlantics became the first ever manager of the St. Louis Brown Stockings. Dickey Pearce is most known for his cunning managerial mind and creating the position of shortstop which he manned for the Brown Stockings in 1875.

Hitters 
The St. Louis Brown Stockings worst hitter—starting catcher Tom Miller—had an OPS+ of 24 over 56 games. He hit .164—33 singles, two doubles, and one walk in 214 at-bats. The St. Louis Brown Stockings best hitter, Lip Pike, hit .346/.352/.494, for an OPS+ of 203—74 singles, 22 doubles, 12 triples. Lip Pike was known as the leagues most athletic hitter and for good reason as he is rumored to have raced a trotting horse and won.

Pitchers 

Eighteen-year-old Pud Galvin is credited with leading the league in ERA (1.16) while just only pitching 62 innings.

Regular season

Season standings

Record vs. opponents

Roster

Player stats

Batting 
Note: G = Games played; AB = At bats; H = Hits; Avg. = Batting average; HR = Home runs; RBI = Runs batted in

Starting pitchers
Note: G = Games pitched; IP = Innings pitched; W = Wins; L = Losses; ERA = Earned run average; SO = Strikeouts

Relief pitchers
Note: G = Games pitched; W = Wins; L = Losses; SV = Saves; ERA = Earned run average; SO = Strikeouts

References

1875 St. Louis Brown Stockings season at Baseball Reference

St. Louis Brown Stockings seasons
1875 in baseball
St. Louis Brown Stockings